Kitchen Radio is the sixth album by American singer/songwriter Peter Mulvey, released in 2004.

Reception

Writing for Allmusic, critic Ronnie D. Lankford Jr. wrote of the album, "Even the listener wishing for greater clarity will nonetheless appreciate the simple arrangements and clean production of Kitchen Radio, highlighted by acoustic and electric guitars and vacillating between tasteful folk and rock. Kitchen Radio is a well-wrought effort with a nicely honed sound that will please anyone who enjoys thoughtful songwriting."

Track listing
"Road to Mallow" (Peter Mulvey) – 3:08
"Shirt" (Mulvey, David "Goody" Goodrich) – 3:10
"29¢ Head" (Mulvey, Goodrich) – 3:38
"Falling" (Mulvey, Goodrich) – 3:48
"Charlie" (Mulvey, Goodrich, Paul Cebar) – 3:09
"Denver, 6 a.m." (Mulvey, Goodrich) – 4:05
"Rise" (Mulvey, Goodrich) – 3:15
"Bloomington" (Mulvey, Goodrich) – 3:40
"Me & Albert" (Mulvey) – 2:56
"You" (Mulvey, Goodrich) – 4:08
"Thirty" (Mulvey, Goodrich) – 3:37
"Toad" (Mulvey) – 3:31
"Sad, Sad, Sad, Sad (And Faraway from Home)" (Mulvey) – 2:48

Personnel
Peter Mulvey – vocals, acoustic guitar
Kris Delmhorst – vocals
David "Goody" Goodrich – guitar
Mike Piehl – drums
Anita Suhanin – vocals
Paul Cebar – vocals
Lou Ulrich – bass

Production notes
David "Goody" Goodrich – producer
Bob St. John – mastering
Amy Ruppel – design, photography

References

Peter Mulvey albums
2004 albums